Cuckoo is a rural locality in the local government area (LGA) of Dorset in the North-east LGA region of Tasmania. The 2016 census recorded a population of 53 for the state suburb of Cuckoo.

History 
Cuckoo was gazetted as a locality in 1969. 

The locality is a logging area. A telegraph station named Cuckoo Valley operated from 1925 to 1929.

Geography
The Great Forester River forms a small part of the north-western boundary.

Road infrastructure 
Route A3 (Tasman Highway) passes to the north. Cuckoo Road provides access to the locality.

References

Towns in Tasmania
Localities of Dorset Council (Australia)